Liisi Oterma (6 January 1915 – 4 April 2001) was a Finnish astronomer, the first woman to get a Ph.D. degree in astronomy in Finland. 

She studied mathematics and astronomy at the University of Turku, and soon became Yrjö Väisälä's assistant and worked on the search for minor planets. She obtained her masters degree in 1938. From 1941 to 1965, Oterma worked as an observer at the university's observatory. She obtained her PhD in 1955 with a  dissertation on telescope optics. She was the first Finnish woman to obtain a PhD in astronomy.
 
In 1959, Oterma became a docent of astronomy and from 1965 to 1978 a professor in University of Turku. In 1971, she succeeded Väisälä as the director of the Tuorla Observatory. She was director of the astronomical-optical research institute at the University of Turku from 1971-1975.

Oterma was interested in languages and spoke German, French, Italian, Spanish, Esperanto, Hungarian, English and also Arabic, for example. Oterma's original plans were to study Sanskrit, but it was not offered at the University of Turku, and the choice was ultimately focused on astronomy. 

Oterma was quiet, modest in nature, and fearful of publicity. Anders Reiz, a professor at the Copenhagen Observatory, among others, said Oterma was “silent in eleven languages”. Oterma avoided appearing in photographs, and there are only a handful of pictures of her.  

She discovered or co-discovered several comets, including periodic comets 38P/Stephan-Oterma, 39P/Oterma and 139P/Väisälä–Oterma. She is also credited by the Minor Planet Center (MPC) with the discovery of 54 minor planets between 1938 and 1953, and ranks 153rd on MPC's all-time discovery chart.

The Hildian asteroid 1529 Oterma, discovered by Finnish astronomer Yrjö Väisälä in 1938, was named in her honour.

Minor planets discovered

References 
 

1915 births
2001 deaths
20th-century women scientists
20th-century astronomers
Discoverers of asteroids
Discoverers of comets

Finnish astronomers
Women astronomers
Astronomy-optics society